Late September is the only studio album by British electronic music duo Deepest Blue. It was released after two UK top ten singles, "Deepest Blue", "and Give It Away", but did not match the success of the singles, peaking at number 22 on the UK Albums Chart and number 13 on Scottish Albums Chart. It did however go on to sell over 70,000 copies in the United Kingdom and was certified Silver.

This album was also released in several countries around the world, including Mexico where it peaked at number 69 on the Albums chart. It was also released in selected European and Asian countries.

Some editions of the album were released as Limited Edition, including a bonus disc with remixes.

Worldwide, the album's success was limited, going on to sell 300,000 copies, causing the professional split of the band members Matt Schwartz & Joel Edwards after being dropped by Ministry of Sound.

Track listing

International Edition
 "Be Still My Heart" - 5:20
 "Can't Believe" - 4:34
 "Is It a Sin" - 3:34
 "Give It Away" - 3:29
 "Turn Out Right" - 4:29
 "Shooting Star" - 4:14
 "Late September" - 5:36
 "Deepest Blue" - 3:26
 "Say Goodbye" - 3:00
 "Spread a Little Love" - 3:53

Special Limited Edition
CD1

as above

CD2
 "Deepest Blue" Original Mix - 6:24
 "Give It Away" Club Mix - 8:17
 "Is It A Sin?" Cicada Stadium Remix - 4:49
 "Shooting Star" Smith & Pledger Remix - 7:35
 "Deepest Blue" Electrique Boutique Vocal Mix - 6:36
 "Give It Away" Michael Woods Remix - 8:40
 "Is It A Sin?" Antillas Remix - 8:45
 "Shooting Star" Full Intention Remix - 8:01
 "Give It Away" Soulside Remix - 4:45
 "Shooting Star" Dirty Remix - 5:56

Credits
 All tracks produced by Matt Schwartz & Joel Edwards
 Vocals by Joel EdwardsAll Instruments by Deepest Blue (unless is listed above)
 All Performing & Arrangements by Matt SchwartzAll Strings Composed by Matt Schwartz
 Assisted by Damon Iddins at The Astoria
 Recorded and Mixed at The Astoria & Destined Studios / Soho Recordings Studios
 Published by Warner/Chappell Music/Windswept Music (London) Ltd.
 Mastered by Bob Ludwig at Gateway Mastering Studios, Portland, United States.
 A&R Direction by Ric Salmon8
 Cover Design by Storm Thorgerson and Peter Curzon
 Photography by Rupert Truman
 Additional Photography by Joshua Richey, Dan Abbott and Bill ThorgersonArtwork by Lee Baker and Joshua Richey
 Band Photography by Lorenzo Agius

"Be Still My Heart"Written by Joel Edwards & Matt SchwartzConducted & Arranged by Simon HaleViolins by Perry Montague-Manso, Patrick Kiernan, Jackie Shave & Gavyn WrightViola by Bruce WhiteCello by David Daniels

"Can't Believe"Written by Joel Edwards & Matt SchwartzDrums by Darrin Mooney

"Is It A Sin?"Written by Joel Edwards & Matt Schwartz

"Give It Away"Written by Joel Edwards & Matt Schwartz

"Turn Out Right"Written by Joel Edwards & Matt SchwartzConducted & Arranged by Simon HaleViolins by Perry Montague-Manso, Patrick Kiernan, Jackie Shave & Gavyn WrightViola by Bruce WhiteCello by David Daniels

"Shooting Star"Written by Joel Edwards & Matt SchwartzDrums by Darrin MooneyConducted & Arranged by Simon HaleViolins by Perry Montague-Manso, Patrick Kiernan, Jackie Shave & Gavyn WrightViola by Bruce WhiteCello by David Daniels

"Late September"Written by Joel Edwards, Matt Schwartz & Jason MilesConducted & Arranged by Simon HaleViolins by Perry Montague-Manso, Patrick Kiernan, Jackie Shave & Gavyn WrightViola by Bruce WhiteCello by David Daniels

"Deepest Blue"Written by Joel Edwards, Matt Schwartz & Anthony Main

"Say Goodbye"Written by Joel Edwards & Matt Schwartz

"Spread a Little Love"Written by Joel Edwards & Matt Schwartz

Charts and certifications

Charts

Certifications

References

2004 debut albums
Ministry of Sound albums